The Girl Can't Help It is a 1956 film.

The Girl Can't Help It may also refer to:
The Girl Can't Help It (song) by Little Richard, written Bobby Troup 1956
"The Girl Can't Help It" song by Exile (American band) S. Lemaire, J.P. Pennington 1988